Lanke is a 2021 Indian Kannada-language action drama film directed by Ram Prasad and produced by Patel Srinivas and Surekha Ram Prasad. The film starring Yogesh, Kavya Shetty, Sanchari Vijay, Krishi Thapanda and Ester Noronha are in the lead roles. The plot of the film is adaptation of Ramayana in modern times. The music for the film is scored by Karthik Sharma and cinematography is done by Ramesh Babu.

Cast 
Yogesh as Ram
Kavya Shetty as Mandara 
Sanchari Vijay
Krishi Thapanda as Paavani 
Ester Noronha
Gayatri Jayaraman           
Suchendra Prasad

References

External links 
 

Indian action drama films
2020s Kannada-language films
2021 action drama films
2021 films
Films shot in Karnataka
Indian gangster films
2020s masala films